Ski jumping at the 2013 Winter Universiade was held at the Trampolino Dal Ben in Predazzo from December 14 to December 20, 2013.

Men's events

Women's events

Mixed events

External links 
Results at the International Ski Federation
Result Book – Ski Jumping

2013 in ski jumping
Ski jumping
Ski jumping competitions in Italy
2013